Written and illustrated by Yasuda Tsuyoshi, Days was serialized in Kodansha's Weekly Shōnen Magazine from April 24, 2013 to January 20, 2021. Kodansha collected its chapters in forty-two tankōbon volumes, released from July 17, 2013 to March 17, 2021.

Kodansha USA publishes the manga in a digital-only format since April 25, 2017.

Volume list

References

Days